The 2003 Mid-American Conference women's basketball tournament was the post-season basketball tournament for the Mid-American Conference (MAC) 2002–03 college basketball season. The 2003 tournament was held March 8–15, 2003. Western Michigan won the championship over Ball State. Casey Rost of Western Michigan was the MVP.

Format
The top three seeds received byes into the quarterfinals. The first round was played at campus sites. All other rounds were held at Gund Arena.

Bracket

All-Tournament Team
Tournament MVP – Casey Rost, Western Michigan

References

Mid-American Conference women's basketball tournament
2002–03 Mid-American Conference women's basketball season
MAC women's basketball tournament
MAC women's basketball tournament
Basketball competitions in Cleveland
College basketball tournaments in Ohio
Women's sports in Ohio
2000s in Cleveland